Gwendalyn Gibson is a mountain bike rider from Southern California. She was the 2016 national champion and competed at the 2017 worlds in Cairns, Australia.

She won her first World Cup at the UCI round in Snoeshow, West Virginia. She won bronze at the 2022 MTB short track world championships in Les Gets, France, behind winner Pauline Ferrand-Prévot and silver medalist Alessandra Keller.

References
Citations

Other
 Profile on MTB Data
 Profile with pictures, Norco Factory Team

Year of birth missing (living people)
Living people
American mountain bikers
American female cyclists
21st-century American women